Tulebo is a locality situated in Mölndal Municipality, Västra Götaland County, Sweden with 213 inhabitants in 2010.

References 

Populated places in Västra Götaland County
Populated places in Mölndal Municipality